Glyn Davi(e)s may refer to:

 Glyn Davies (economist) (1919–2003), Welsh economist
 Glyn Davies (footballer, born 1932) (1932–2013), Welsh footballer
 Glyn Davies (footballer, born 1909) (1909–1985), Welsh footballer
 Glyn Davies (rugby union) (1927–1976), Wales international rugby union player
 Glyn Davies (politician) (born 1944), British Conservative Party politician
 Glyn Davis (born 1959), Australian academic
 Glyn T. Davies (born 1957), U.S. diplomat

See also
 Glen Davies (disambiguation)